Cyrtodactylus pageli  is a species of gecko, a lizard in the family Gekkonidae. The species is endemic to Laos.

Etymology
The specific name, pageli, is in honor of German zoologist Theodor Bernhard Pagel.

Geographic range
C. pageli is found in northwestern Laos, in Vientiane Province.

Habitat

Description

Reproduction
The mode of reproduction of C. pageli is unknown.

References

Further reading
Schneider N, Nguyen TQ, Schmitz A, Kingsada P, Auer M, Ziegler T (2011). "A new species of karst dwelling Cyrtodactylus (Squamata: Gekkonidae) from northwestern Laos". Zootaxa 2930: 1–21. (Cyrtodactylus pageli, new species).

Cyrtodactylus
Reptiles described in 2011